Matthew Pyke of Stowmarket, Suffolk, was a British student who had resided in Nottingham since 2006 with his girlfriend Joanna Witton. He was murdered by 21-year-old David Heiss from Limburg, Germany, on 19 September 2008. Pyke's murder was motivated by Heiss's obsession with Witton.

Pyke, known online as Shade, and Witton were administrators on the Advance Wars fansite Wars Central, where Heiss was a registered user under the screen name "Eagle_the_Lightning".

Murder 
Heiss developed an obsessive infatuation with Witton, and travelled to Nottingham both in June and August 2008 to meet Witton and Pyke in person. As Heiss didn't have a hotel reservation, he stayed one night at the apartment of Pyke and Witton. After being admonished and rebuffed by Witton, Heiss travelled to Britain two more times, and met with Pyke and Witton. During his last visit to the UK, on the morning of 19 September 2008, Heiss forced his way in to Pyke's flat and proceeded to kill him by stabbing him 86 times. His body was found by Witton later that day.

Killer's arrest 
Heiss was arrested at his home in Limburg and in May 2009 he was sentenced to a minimum of 18 years in prison.

See also 
 Internet homicide

References 

English murder victims
Year of birth missing
2008 deaths